Lewis Miller (July 24, 1829 – February 17, 1899) was an American businessman and philanthropist who made a fortune in the late 19th century as inventor of the first combine (harvester-reaper machine) with the blade mounted efficiently in front of the driver, to the side of the horse(s), rather than pulled behind. His daughter Mina (1865–1947) married fellow Ohio inventor Thomas Alva Edison on February 24, 1886.

Biography
Miller was born in Greentown, Ohio. He devoted much of his wealth to public service and to charitable causes associated with the Methodist Episcopal Church, and was the inventor of the "Akron Plan" for Sunday schools, a building layout with a central assembly hall surrounded by small classrooms, a configuration Miller conceived with Methodist minister John Heyl Vincent and architect Jacob Snyder. The arrangement accommodated 1) a collective opening exercise for all the children; 2) small radiating classrooms for graded instruction in the uniform lesson of the day; and 3) a general closing exercise in the central assembly area.

John Heyl Vincent collaborating was baptist layman B.F. Jacobs devised a system to encourage Sunday school work, and a committee was established to provide the International Uniform Lesson Curriculum, also known as the "Uniform Lesson Plan".  By the 1800s, 80% of all new members were introduced to the church through Sunday school.

In 1874, interested in improving the training of Sunday school teachers for the Uniform Lesson Plan, Miller and Vincent worked together again to found what is now the Chautauqua Institution on the shores of Chautauqua Lake, New York.

Miller died in 1899 of kidney disease and was buried in Glendale Cemetery in Akron, Ohio.

References

Further reading
New York Times, February 18, 1899, p12
Lewis Miller by Ellwood Hendrick, 1925.  . Book, discusses his farm machinery patents as well as his co-founding of the Chautauqua Institution.
"Theodore W. Miller Rough Rider, his Diary as a soldier together with the story of his life..." by George E Vincent 1899

External links

 Biography at National Inventors Hall of Fame
 
 1899 film of a Buckeye Mower (Reaper) harvesting wheat in Queensland Australia (link appears inactive)

1829 births
1899 deaths
19th-century American inventors
19th-century American philanthropists
People from Stark County, Ohio
Chautauqua Institution
Methodists from Ohio
Edison family
Burials at Glendale Cemetery, Akron
Philanthropists from Ohio
Methodists from New York (state)